Larry Rice (24 March 1946 – 20 May 2009) was an American racing driver in the USAC and CART Championship Car series. He was the 1973 USAC National midget driver's champion and won the USAC Silver Crown series in 1977 and 1981. He was inducted in the National Midget Auto Racing Hall of Fame in 1993.

Racing career

Larry's father Bob got him started in racing. Bob purchased Larry's first race car, a Kurtis Craft Half Midget from Bob Cunningham in Covington, Indiana prior to turning twelve years old. Larry went to Modified Midget racing at the Logansport, Indiana track from 1965-1967. While in modified midget racing Larry and his father introduced the first car with a suspension system in this type of racing. It was made by Kurtis out of Indianapolis, Indiana. Eventually all cars would have suspension systems on them.

Larry graduated from college with a teaching degree. He taught school briefly while racing the modified midget racing circuit. He was fondly known as "The Flying School Teacher" due to his ability to win races.

Larry's father Bob worked as a pit crew member for various race teams at the Indianapolis 500 in the 1970s.

Open wheel career
Rice had a major win when he won the 1970 Hut Hundred. Rice finished third in 1972 USAC National Midget championship, helping his team (Shannon Brothers) win the owner's championship. Rice followed up by winning the 1973 USAC National midget driver's championship himself. Rice was also the 1977 and 1981 USAC Silver Crown Series champion. He won the Silver Crown and sprint car portions of the 4 Crown Nationals at Eldora Speedway in 1985. He won his second Silver Crown portion at Eldora in 1987.

Championship car career
He raced in 5 seasons (1974, and 1978–1979, and 1981), with 9 combined career starts, including the 1978 and 1979 Indianapolis 500 and finished in the top ten 3 times.  He was co-named the 1978 Indianapolis 500 Rookie of the Year, along with Rick Mears, for his 11th-place finish.

Announcing career
After he stopped racing in 1991, he became the color analyst on ESPN's Saturday Night Thunder program. The program featured midget, sprint, and Silver Crown racing.  He also worked as ESPN's regular analyst on IRL races. He was known for constantly pointing out when a driver "had to get out of the throttle" to avoid hitting another car.

Insurance Business

Rice later worked for K&K Insurance, specialising in motorsport insurance, and with his son Robbie (who also raced), started their own insurance organisation for motorsport, Short Track Independent Drivers and Associates (STIDA.COM).

Death

Rice died from lung cancer on 20 May 2009.

Complete USAC Championship Car results

Complete PPG Indy Car Series results

Indianapolis 500 results

References

1946 births
2009 deaths
Champ Car drivers
Racing drivers from Indiana
Indianapolis 500 drivers
Indianapolis 500 Rookies of the Year
Motorsport announcers
Deaths from lung cancer
Deaths from cancer in Indiana
USAC Silver Crown Series drivers